Karen Routhier (born February 11, 1991 in Quebec City, Quebec) is a Canadian ice dancer. She competed with partner Eric Saucke-Lacelle. They are the 2009 Canadian junior national champions.

Competitive highlights
(with Saucke-Lacelle)

References

External links 
 

1991 births
Living people
French Quebecers
Canadian female ice dancers
Sportspeople from Quebec City